Tea is an important part of Russian culture. Due in part to Russia's cold northern climate, it is today considered the de facto national beverage, one of the most popular beverages in the country, and is closely associated with traditional Russian culture. Russian tea is brewed and can be served sweet, and hot or cold. It is traditionally taken at afternoon tea, but has since spread as an all day drink, especially at the end of meals, served with dessert. A notable aspect of Russian tea culture is the samovar, which is used for brewing.

History

There is a wide-spread legend claiming that Russian people first came in contact with tea in 1567, when the Cossack Atamans Petrov and Yalyshev visited China. This was popularized in the popular and widely-read Tales of the Russian People by Ivan Sakharov, but modern historians generally consider the manuscript to be fake, and the embassy of Petrov and Yalyshev itself is fictional.

 
Tea culture accelerated in 1638 when a Mongolian ruler donated four poods (65–70 kg) of tea to Tsar Michael I .  According to Jeremiah Curtin, it was possibly in 1636 that Vassili Starkov was sent as envoy to the Altyn Khan. As a gift to the Tsar, he was given 250 pounds of tea. Starkov at first refused, seeing no use for a load of dead leaves, but the Khan insisted. Thus was tea introduced to Russia. In 1679, Russia concluded a treaty on regular tea supplies from China via camel caravan in exchange for furs. The Chinese ambassador to Moscow made a gift of several chests of tea to Alexis I. However, the difficult trade route made the cost of tea extremely high, so that the beverage became available only to royalty and the very wealthy of Russia. In 1689, the Treaty of Nerchinsk was signed that formalized Russia's sovereignty over Siberia, and also marked the creation of the Tea Road that traders used between Russia and China.

Between the Treaty of Nerchinsk and the Treaty of Kyakhta (1727), Russia would increase its caravans going to China for tea, but only through state dealers. In 1706, Peter the Great made it illegal for any merchants to trade in Beijing. In 1786, Catherine the Great re-established regular imports of tea. By the time of Catherine's death in 1796, Russia was importing more than 3 million pounds by camel caravan in the form of loose tea and tea bricks, enough tea to considerably lower the price so that middle and lower class Russians could afford the beverage.

The word “tea” in Russian was first encountered in medical texts of the mid-17th century, for example, in “Materials for the history of medicine in Russia”: “herbs for tea; ramon color (?) - 3 handfuls each” (issue 2, No. 365, 1665, 291), “boiled  (probably  or the same, but through the Greek “scale”) to a leaf of Khinskiy (typo: khanskiy)”.

The peak year for the Kiakhta tea trade was in 1824, and the peak year for the tea caravans was 1860. From then, they started to decline when the first leg of the Trans-Siberian Railway was completed in 1880. Faster train service reduced the time it took for tea to arrive in Russia from 16 months to seven weeks. The decline in Chinese tea in the mid 19th century in turn meant that Russia began to import more tea from Odessa, and London. By 1905, horse drawn tea transport had ended, and by 1925 caravan as the sole means of transport for tea had ended. In 2002, Russia imported some 162,000 metric tons of tea.

By the late 19th century, Wissotzky Tea had become the largest tea firm in the Russian Empire. By the early 20th century, Wissotzky was the largest tea manufacturer in the world.

By the end of the 18th century, tea prices had moderately declined. The first local tea plant was set in Nikitsk botanical gardens in 1814, while the first industrial tea plantation was established in 1885.  The tea industry did not take off until World War I, and greatly expanded following World War II. However, by the mid 1990s, tea production came to a standstill. Today, the main area in Russia for tea production is in the vicinity of Sochi.

Varieties
Traditionally, black tea is the most common tea in Russia, but green tea is becoming more popular.

Traditional tea in Russia includes the traditional type known as Russian Caravan as it was originally imported from China via camel caravan. As the trip was very long, usually taking as long as sixteen to eighteen months, the tea acquired its distinctive smoky flavor from the caravan's campfires. Today, this tea is often given its smoky flavor after oxidation or is a keemun or a "black or oolong from southern China or Formosa (Taiwan) with a hint of smoky Lapsang Souchong or Tarry Souchong."

Brewing

A notable feature of Russian tea culture is the two-step brewing process. First, tea concentrate called zavarka (Russian: заварка) is prepared: a quantity of dry tea sufficient for several persons is brewed in a small teapot. Then, each person pours some quantity of this concentrate into the cup and mixes it with hot water; thus, one can make one's tea as strong as one wants, according to one's taste. Sugar, lemon, honey or jam can then be added freely.

Tea culture

According to William Pokhlyobkin, tea in Russia was not regarded as a self-dependent beverage; thus, even the affluent classes adorned it with a jam, syrup, cakes, cookies, candies, lemon and other sweets. This is similar to the archaic idiom "чай да сахар" (tea and sugar, translit. ). The Russian language utilizes some memes pertaining to tea consumption, including "чайку-с?" ("some tea?" in an archaic manner, translit. ), used by the pre-Revolutionary attendants. The others are "гонять чаи" (chase the teas, i.e. drinking the tea for overly prolonged periods; translit. ) and "побаловаться чайком" (indulging in tea, translit. ). Tea was made a significant element of cultural life by the literati of the Karamzinian circle. By the mid-19th century tea had won over the town class, the merchants and the petty bourgeoisie. This is reflected in the dramas of Alexander Ostrovsky. Since Ostrovsky's time, the duration of time and the amount of tea consumed have appreciated. Alexander Pushkin in Eugene Onegin displayed the role of tea in establishing romantic relations:
Of single boredom, right away
They speak–but in a cunning way.
They call him to their samovar–
None but Dunya will pour the tea;
They whisper to her: "Dunya, see!"
And then produce her sweet guitar.
O Christ! She then begins to cheep:
"Come see me in my golden keep!"
 
In the Soviet period, tea-drinking was extremely popular in the daily life of office workers (female secretaries, laboratory assistants, etc.). Tea brands of the time were nicknamed "the brooms" (Georgian) and "the tea with an elephant" (Indian). Tea was an immutable element of kitchen life among the intelligentsia in 1960s-'70s.

In pre-Revolutionary Russia there was a joke "что после чаю следует?" ('what follows after tea?', translit. chto poslye chayu slyeduyet) with the correct answer being "the resurrection of the dead" from the Nicene Creed. This is based on the word "чаю" (chayu), the homograph designating formerly "I expect" ("look for" in the creed) and the partitive case of the word "tea", still in use.

Within Russia, tea preparation differs, but usually includes lemon, and sugar or jam. Tea sachets are widely popular, but when a teapot is used it is very common to make a strong brew, then pour some into a cup and top it with hot or boiling water, adding milk and sugar afterwards.

In the 19th century, Russians drank their tea with a cube of sugar (from sugarloaf) held between their teeth. The tradition still exists today.

Tea is very popular in Russian prisons. Traditional mind-altering substances such as alcohol are typically prohibited, and very high concentrations, called chifir are used as a substitute.

Traditional forms of Russian tea ware include the Russian tea brewing urn called a samovar, the Lomonosov tea sets adorned with a cobalt blue net design and 22 karat gold, and traditional Russian tea glass holders.

"Russian Tea" in other countries

United States
There is a beverage called "Russian Tea" which likely originated in America. This drink is especially popular in the Southeastern United States where it is traditionally served at social events during Advent and Christmastide. Recipes vary, but the most common ingredients are loose black tea, orange juice (or orange peel), cinnamon, and cloves; some recipes use instant tea powder. Other juices such as lemon and pineapple are sometimes called for. Cream may also be added when serving. A homemade 'instant' variety, often using Tang, has become a popular stocking stuffer in recent decades.

The drink is served hot and often an evening or after-meal beverage. However, iced versions are sometimes offered with meals at cafés.

Despite the name, "Russian Tea" probably has no link to its namesake. References to "Russian Tea" and instructions have been found in American newspapers and cookbooks dating as early as the 1880s.

Japan
In Japan, the term "Russian tea" is used to refer specifically to the act of having black tea with a spoonful of jam, whether added into the cup or placed on the tongue before drinking. The typical choice is strawberry jam, but not exclusively so.

Notes

Bibliography 
 Audra Jo Yoder, Myth and Memory in Russian Tea Culture, «Studies in Slavic Cultures», Issue VIII, August 2009.

Russia
Economic history of Russia
Russian culture
Culture
China–Russian Empire relations